HandPicked is a smooth jazz studio album by jazz guitarist Earl Klugh released on July 30, 2013. This is Klugh's first album of new material since he released The Spice of Life in 2008 and it is also his first for the Heads Up label. This album showcases Klugh playing solo guitar on 13 of the 16 songs included here. Bill Frisell, Jake Shimabukuro, and Vince Gill all co-produced and played on one song each.

Reception

Writing for Allmusic, critic Thom Jurek wrote, "It's been five years since Earl Klugh issued the smooth chamber group offering The Spice of Life." "It's been a long time since we heard Klugh this way, almost totally solo, taking an intimate look at music he loves from across the spectrum. His graceful yet inventive playing, the clean production, and a canny choice of material make Hand Picked one of the finest recordings in his catalog."

Jason Shadrick of Premier Guitar gives the album a 4 out of a possible 5 picks and writes, "On HandPicked, Klugh sticks with mainly pop and jazz standards and doesn't fall into the trap of over-arranging tunes to the detriment of melodies. He opens with Burt Bacharach's "Alfie," holding true to the original’s melody, but adding his trademark harmonic twists and turns, as well as occasional technical flash."

Brent Faulkner of PopMatters gives the album 7 out of a possible 10 and concludes his review with, "Ultimately, Handpicked is pleasant showing the total musician flexing his muscles. The bar has long been established for Klugh, but this effort is definitely confirmation of his elite status."

Matthew Alley reviews the album for Black Grooves and concludes, "While it may be a bit inconsistent at times, overall Handpicked is a strong effort from the virtuoso guitarist and is well-deserving of its Grammy nomination for Best Pop Instrumental Album of 2013.  Klugh continues to surprise and delight with his clever arrangements, compositions, and performances."

Track listing

"Alfie" (Burt Bacharach, Hal David) – 2:34
"Lullaby of Birdland" (George Shearing) – 2:28
"Blue Moon" (Duet with Bill Frisell) (Lorenz Hart, Richard Rodgers) – 6:11
"In Six" (Earl Klugh) – 4:08
"Cast Your Fate To The Wind" (Vince Guaraldi) – 3:14
"Hotel California" (Duet with Jake Shimabukuro) (Don Felder, Glenn Frey, Don Henley) – 8:05
"More and More Amor" (Sol Lake) – 3:38
"'Round Midnight" (Thelonious Monk, Cootie Williams, Bernard Hanighen) – 2:31
"But Beautiful" (Johnny Burke, Jimmy Van Heusen) – 1:48
"All I Have to Do Is Dream" (Duet with Vince Gill) (Boudleaux Bryant) – 3:46
"Goin' Out of My Head" (Teddy Randazzo, Bobby Weinstein) – 3:39
"If I Fell" (John Lennon, Paul McCartney) – 1:58
"Where the Wind Takes Me" (Klugh) – 2:03
"Morning Rain" (Klugh) – 3:16
"Love Is a Many Splendored Thing" (Sammy Fain, Paul Francis Webster) – 2:21
"This Time (Solo)" (Klugh) – 3:56

Personnel
Earl Klugh – Guitar 
Bill Frisell – Guitar on "Blue Moon"
Jake Shimabukuro – Ukulele on "Hotel California"
Vince Gill – Guitar and Vocals on "All I Have To Do Is Dream"

Production notes
Produced by Earl Klugh (unless otherwise noted)
Recorded by Burt Elliott for Burt Elliott Sound at Studio 861, Atlanta, GA
"Blue Moon"
Produced by Bill Frisell and Earl Klugh
Recorded by Tucker Martine at Flora Recording and Playback, Portland, OR
Assistant Engineer: Michael Finn

"Hotel California"
Produced by Jake Shimabukuro and Earl Klugh
Recorded by Erik Zobler at The Record Plant, Hollywood, CA
Assistant Engineer: Daniel Zaidenstadt

"All I Have To Do Is Dream"
Produced by Vince Gill and Earl Klugh
Recorded by Matt Rausch at "The House" Studios, Nashville, TN

Mixed by Burt Elliott for Burt Elliott Sound at Studio 861, Atlanta, GA
Mastered by Alan Silverman for ARF Mastering, Inc., New York, NY

References

Earl Klugh albums
2013 albums